Zviad Izoria (Georgian: ზვიად იზორია, born 6 January 1984 in Georgia) is a chess grandmaster playing for the United States. Zviad is a winner of HB Global Chess Challenge and a $50,000 in prize money. He played on the Georgian team at 2002, 2004, and 2008 chess olympiad. Zviad was a 2005 World Cup participant and 2007 World Cup qualifier.

Selected tournament victories
 2000: Victory at the World Youth Chess Championship for U16.
 2000: Winner of the Moscow Kasparov Cup.
 2001: Victory at the European Youth Chess Championship for U18. Victory at the European Junior Chess Championship for U20.
 2002: Victory at the European Junior Chess Championship for U20.
 2005: Winner of the HB Global Chess Challenge 2005, and a prize of $50,000 (USD), along with a valuable jeweled watch.
 2018: Victory over Fabiano Caruana (2018 World Championship Challenger) and Hikaru Nakamura at the US Chess Championship.
 2020: First place in the 29th annual North American Open along with Hovhannes Gabuzyan.

Notes

External links
Zviad Izoria chess games at 365Chess.com

1984 births
Living people
Chess grandmasters
Chess players from Georgia (country)
World Youth Chess Champions
American chess players
Georgian emigrants to the United States